Léon Joseph Ambroise Hecht (born 17 February, 1884; death date unknown) was a French sports shooter. He competed in two events at the 1908 Summer Olympics.

References

External links
 

1884 births
Year of death missing
French male sport shooters
Olympic shooters of France
Shooters at the 1908 Summer Olympics
Place of birth missing